Lešje is a settlement in the Municipality of Vojnik in eastern Slovenia. It lies just east of Arclin next to Lake Šmartno. The area is part of the traditional region of Styria. It is now included with the rest of the municipality in the Savinja Statistical Region.

References

External links
Lešje at Geopedia

Populated places in the Municipality of Vojnik